Marceline or Marcelline may refer to:

People with the given name
Marceline Desbordes-Valmore (1786–1859), French poet
Marceline Orbes (1874–1927), Spanish clown
Marceline Day (1908–2000), American actress whose career began as a child in the 1910s
Marcelline Jayakody (1902–1998), Sri Lankan Catholic priest, musician, and journalist
 Marcelline Picard-Kanapé (born 1941), Innu teacher and chief

Characters 
Marceline, character from the play The Marriage of Figaro by Pierre Beaumarchais
Marceline the Vampire Queen, a character in the animated series Adventure Time

Places
Marceline, Pasadena, California, neighborhood
Marcelline, Illinois
Marceline, Missouri
Sainte-Marcelline-de-Kildare, Quebec
Villa Sainte-Marcelline, private French school in Westmount, Quebec

See also
Marceline (fabric)
1730 Marceline, a main-belt asteroid
Jason and Marceline, a 1986 young adult novel by Jerry Spinelli

French feminine given names